The 2009 West Asian Futsal Federation Championship was held from to in Amman, Jordan. Iraq won the tournament.

Final standings

Matches and results

Awards 

 Most Valuable Player

 Top Scorer

 Fair-Play Award

See also
 West Asian Futsal Championship

References 

2009
2009
WAFF
2009–10 in Jordanian football
2009–10 in Iraqi football
2009–10 in Lebanese football
2009–10 in Syrian football
2009–10 in Bahraini football